The Attorney General for the District of Columbia is the chief legal officer of the District of Columbia. While attorneys general previously were appointed by the mayor, District of Columbia voters approved a charter amendment in 2010 that  made the office an elected position beginning in 2015.

History

Charter amendment
In the November 2, 2010, general election, voters approved Charter Amendment IV that made the office of Attorney General an elected position.

Election delays
In July 2012, the District of Columbia council voted to postpone the election of attorney general to 2018, citing a dispute over how much power the elected attorney general would have. Council Chairman Phil Mendelson called the vote "an embarrassment."

In September 2013, Paul Zukerberg filed suit against the District of Columbia Council and the city elections claiming any delay would violate the District charter — which was amended through the 2010 ballot question to provide for the election of the city’s top lawyer. Attorney General Irv Nathan initially argued that Zukerberg was not suffering any “meaningful hardship” from pushing back the election.

On February 7, 2014, a District of Columbia Superior Court judge ruled that ballots for the April 1 primary could be printed without the Attorney General race. Zukerberg appealed the ruling, declaring himself a candidate and arguing that he would suffer "irreparable harm" if the election were postponed.

On June 4, 2014, the District of Columbia Court of Appeals overturned the lower court's decision. The Court held "that the Superior Court's interpretation was incorrect as a matter of law" and reversed. The Court ruled that the original language in the Elected Attorney General Act is ambiguous in stating the election "shall be after January 1, 2014," and that the attorney general referendum ratified by a majority of District of Columbia voters in 2010 made it seem as though the election would take place in 2014. On June 13, Zukerberg collected nominating petitions.

2014 election

Joining Zukerberg as candidates for the position were insurance litigator and activist Lorie Masters, federal lawyer Edward "Smitty" Smith, white-collar attorney Karl Racine, and legislative policy analyst Lateefah Williams. Racine secured a plurality victory, winning 36% of the votes cast, and was sworn in as the first elected Attorney General in January 2015.

Attorneys General for the District of Columbia
In 1824, the position of City Attorney was established by resolution of the City Council. When the District of Columbia took on the territorial form of government on July 1, 1871, the position of Attorney for the District of Columbia was established by the First Legislative Assembly. In 1901, the position title was changed to City Solicitor, and in 1902, the title was changed to Corporation Counsel, which it remained until 2004. In 2004, the office's name was changed from Corporation Counsel to Attorney General by Mayor's Order 2004-92, May 26, making Robert Spagnoletti the only person to hold both titles.

City Attorneys (1824-1871)

Appointed before Home Rule

Appointed after Home Rule

Elected

References

External links
 District of Columbia Attorney General official website
 Search for articles at ABA Journal
 News and Commentary at FindLaw
 District of Columbia Code at Law.Justia.com
 U.S. Supreme Court Opinions - "Cases with title containing: District of Columbia" at FindLaw
 District of Columbia Bar
 District of Columbia Attorney General Karl A. Racine profile at National Association of Attorneys General
 Press releases at District of Columbia Attorney General

 
1973 establishments in Washington, D.C.